Prince Henry Heights is a residential locality on the outskirts of Toowoomba in the Toowoomba Region, Queensland, Australia.

Geography
It was named for Prince Henry, Duke of Gloucester, who served as Governor-General of Australia from 1945 until 1947; the suburb's boundary road had been known as Prince Henry Drive well before 1945.

The suburb consists of a small residential area surrounded by Jubilee Park and Redwood Park, two large bushland reserves along Toowoomba's eastern edge.

History
At the  Prince Henry Heights had a population of 512 people. Prince Henry Heights was among the most socio-economically advantaged suburbs of Toowoomba; at the 2006 census, residents had a median individual income of $736, compared with $448 for the Toowoomba statistical district, and a median family income of $1,856 compared to $1,116. The suburb had a SEIFA score of 1139, placing it ahead of all other suburbs except Blue Mountain Heights and Redwood.

Education 
There are no schools in Prince Henry Heights. The nearest primary school is in East Toowoomba. The nearest secondary school is Toowoomba State High School in Mount Lofty.

References

Suburbs of Toowoomba
Localities in Queensland